Santa Clara de Louredo is a parish of the municipality of Beja, in southeast Portugal. The population in 2011 was 864, in an area of 71.88 km2.

References

Freguesias of Beja, Portugal